Mazon Township is one of seventeen townships in Grundy County, Illinois, USA.  As of the 2010 census, its population was 1,487 and it contained 621 housing units.

Geography

Cities, towns, villages
 Mazon

Cemeteries
The township contains these four cemeteries: Brookside, Old Mazon, Ward and Wheeler.

Major highways
  Illinois Route 47

Airports and landing strips
 J B Fillman Airport

Demographics

School districts
 Coal City Community Unit School District 1

Political districts
 Illinois' 11th congressional district
 State House District 75
 State Senate District 38

References
 
 United States Census Bureau 2007 TIGER/Line Shapefiles
 United States National Atlas

External links
 City-Data.com
 Illinois State Archives

Townships in Grundy County, Illinois
Townships in Illinois
1849 establishments in Illinois